Nathan Wayne Mondou (born March 24, 1995) is an American professional baseball infielder in the Chicago White Sox organization. He has played in Major League Baseball (MLB) for the Oakland Athletics.

Amateur career
Mondou attended Charles Wright Academy in University Place, Washington, and Wake Forest University, where he played college baseball for the Wake Forest Demon Deacons. In 2015, he played collegiate summer baseball with the Chatham Anglers of the Cape Cod Baseball League.

Professional career
The Oakland Athletics selected Mondou in the 13th round, with the 382nd overall selection, of the 2016 MLB draft. The Athletics promoted him to the major leagues on October 3, 2022. He made his debut the next day. He elected free agency on November 10, 2022.

On January 31, 2023, Mondou signed a minor league contract with the Chicago White Sox organization.

References

External links

Living people
Baseball players from Tacoma, Washington
Major League Baseball infielders
Oakland Athletics players
Wake Forest Demon Deacons baseball players
Wisconsin Woodchucks players
Chatham Anglers players
Arizona League Athletics players
Vermont Lake Monsters players
Beloit Snappers players
Stockton Ports players
Midland RockHounds players
Las Vegas Aviators players
1995 births